C. compacta  may refer to:
 Canna compacta, a plant species distributed between the south of Brazil and northern Argentina
 Catopsis compacta, a plant species endemic to Mexico
 Clathrina compacta, a sponge species
 Cochliopina compacta, a very small freshwater snail species endemic to Mexico

See also
 Compacta (disambiguation)